Minuscule 500 (in the Gregory-Aland numbering), ε 323 (in the Soden numbering), is a Greek minuscule manuscript of the New Testament, on parchment. Palaeographically it has been assigned to the 13th-century. Scrivener labeled it by number 587. The manuscript was adapted for liturgical use. It is lacunose.

Description 

The codex contains the text of the four Gospels on 244 parchment leaves (size ) with some lacunae (John 18:7-21; 19:40-21:25). The text is written in one column per page, 23 lines per page.

There is also a division according to the Ammonian Sections (in Mark 234 sections, the last in 16:9), (without references to the Eusebian Canons).

It lacks the Eusebian tables but there is space for it. Synaxarion and Menologion, liturgical books with hagiographies, added by a later hand on paper.

Text 

The Greek text of the codex is a representative of the Byzantine text-type. Hermann von Soden classified it to the textual family K1. Aland placed it in Category V.
According to the Claremont Profile Method it belongs to the textual family Kx in Luke 20. In Luke 1 and Luke 10 no profile was made because of illegible text.

History 

It is dated by the INTF to the 13th-century.

The manuscript was added to the list of New Testament manuscripts by Scrivener (587) and Gregory (500). It was examined by Bloomfield, Scrivener, and Gregory. Gregory saw it in 1883.

It is currently housed at the British Library (Add MS 17982) in London.

See also 

 List of New Testament minuscules
 Biblical manuscript
 Textual criticism

References

Further reading 

 

Greek New Testament minuscules
13th-century biblical manuscripts
British Library additional manuscripts